() is a novella by Claude Piron, one of the most famous works of Esperanto literature.

In the novella, dialogue begins simply and progresses in difficulty using everyday vocabulary (with word-lists available in various languages). It is suitable for beginners trying to improve their grasp of the Esperanto language, and includes rehearsal of basic grammar and an entertaining story.

The mystery begins when three college students witness the strange disappearance of Gerda, a woman who is an expert in 'cryptic languages'.

Published as a book, Gerda malaperis! has since been incorporated into electronic courseware. A movie is available on DVD.

External links
 La Gerda-kurso en la reto - Advanced, 25-part Esperanto course based on the text of the novella.
 "Gerda malaperis!" on lernu.net - Intermediate Esperanto course, 25 chapters and epilogue.
 Esperanto-Jeunes - "Gerda Malaperis!" and other Esperanto courses, in French.
 Gerda interattiva - "Gerda Malaperis!" course for Italian speakers.

Esperanto literature